John Cunliffe Pickersgill-Cunliffe (1819 – 6 October 1873) was a British banker, who briefly served as Member of Parliament for Bewdley in 1869, representing the Conservative Party.

Early life
Born John Cunliffe Pickersgill in 1819 to John Pickersgill, a banker, and Sophia Pickersgill (née Cunliffe), he assumed the name Cunliffe as a second surname in 1867, after inheriting the estate of an aunt of that name.  He married Helen Hutton Dale, daughter of the Dean of Rochester Cathedral, in 1849.

Election
In 1869, a by-election was held in the Bewdley constituency, after the victory of Richard Atwood Glass in the 1868 general election was declared void.  Pickersgill-Cunliffe was elected in the by-election, only for his victory to also be declared void on petition later that year, in favour of Augustus Anson.  Pickersgill-Cunliffe served as an MP for only six weeks, from 11 March until 30 April 1869.

Death
Pickersgill-Cunliffe was struck by a train at Caterham Junction railway station (now known as Purley station) on 22 September 1873, near his home in Coulsdon, Surrey.  He died two weeks later, on 6 October 1873, at Guy's Hospital in London.  An inquest recorded a verdict of accidental death.

References

1819 births
1873 deaths
Conservative Party (UK) MPs for English constituencies
UK MPs 1868–1874
Railway accident deaths in England